Wharton Fill is one of a number of fills (embankments) on the Lackawanna Cut-Off railroad line in northwest New Jersey.  Located between mileposts 51.1 and 51.6 in Byram Township, the fill was constructed between 1908 and 1911 by contractor David W. Flickwir.  The fill, which was created by placing fill material obtained by blasting with dynamite or other methods, is about 0.5 miles (0.64 km) long.  Most of the material that was used to create Wharton Fill was excavated from the surrounding low-lying area through which Pumpkin Run runs; several of the borrow pits have since flooded and become ponds.

Wharton Fill is located on a tangent (straight) section of right-of-way, permitting 80 mph (113 km/h), and is just west of Lubber Run Fill and just east of Roseville Tunnel.  This section is scheduled to receive a single track as part of the reactivation of the line, which was abandoned in 1983.  NJ Transit rail service is projected to begin no earlier than 2026. 

Wharton Fill is named for the Wharton Steel Company, from whom this section of right-of-way was acquired.

References 

Lackawanna Cut-Off
Railway lines opened in 1911
Railway lines closed in 1983